The 1984 Coppa Italia Final was the final of the 1983–84 Coppa Italia. The match was played over two legs on 21 and 26 June 1984 between Roma and Hellas Verona. 
Roma won 2–1 on aggregate. It was Hellas Verona's third final and third defeat.

First leg

Second leg

References
Coppa Italia 1983/84 statistics at rsssf.com

Coppa Italia Finals
Coppa Italia Final 1984
Hellas Verona F.C. matches